All Star Extravaganza VIII was a professional wrestling pay-per-view event produced by Ring of Honor (ROH). It took place on September 30, 2016 at the Lowell Memorial Auditorium in Lowell, Massachusetts. Wrestlers from Mexico's Consejo Mundial de Lucha Libre (CMLL), and Japan's New Japan Pro-Wrestling (NJPW) also appeared on the card, as ROH has partnerships with both promotions.

This was the eighth event under the All Star Extravaganza chronology.

Storylines 
All Star Extravaganza VIII featured professional wrestling matches that involved wrestlers from pre-existing scripted feuds or storylines that played out on ROH's television program, Ring of Honor Wrestling. Wrestlers portrayed heroes (faces) or villains (heels) as they followed a series of events that built tension and culminated in a wrestling match or series of matches.

Results

See also
 List of ROH pay-per-view events
 2016 in professional wrestling

References

External links 
ROH website

Professional wrestling in Massachusetts
Events in Massachusetts
Events in Lowell, Massachusetts
2016 in Massachusetts
September 2016 events in the United States
2016 Ring of Honor pay-per-view events
History of Lowell, Massachusetts